Luis María Larrañaga Merlo (born June 13, 1966), known as Luis Merlo, is a Spanish actor.

Biography

Early years
Luis Merlo was born on June 13, 1966, in Madrid. As a child, he frequently traveled with his parents, Carlos Larrañaga and María Luisa Merlo, who were also actors, and he became accustomed to seeing them on their theatrical tours, both performing and backstage, along with his three siblings: Amparo Larrañaga, Kako Larrañaga, and Pedro Larrañaga, who is married to the actress Maribel Verdú.

Thus, as a child, Merlo regarded the art of acting as something natural. The influence of his maternal grandfather, Ismael Merlo, who took care of him after the divorce of his parents, reinforced this idea. The fact that, in his early years, he released an album for young children, confirmed his interest in the arts.

As a young man, Merlo took dance classes for a year, after which he studied a degree in Drama. When Merlo had finished his studies, Mario Gas gave him his very first acting role in a version of Salomé, produced by the Núria Espert company in 1985.

Career
In 1986, Merlo made his cinematic debut with Hay que deshacer la casa, in which he played a young boy who sexually molested an old woman, a role played by his aunt, Amparo Rivelles. He finished that year touring with La última luna menguante, directed by Manuel Collado, with whom he also did the play Séneca, o el beneficio de la duda in 1987, starring José Luis Pellicena. Soon afterwards, he had his first starring role in a movie, La señora, in which he played a bellboy in a hotel.

Apart from cinema, he has been a regular face on Spanish television, with notable roles in Aquí no hay quien viva, Hospital Central and El Internado. In 2016, he made his debut in La que se avecina, reuniting with many of his former colleagues from Aquí no hay quien viva.

Filmography

Television

References

 

1966 births
Living people
Spanish male film actors
Spanish male television actors
20th-century Spanish actresses
21st-century Spanish male actors